Porta di Terra (Italian for Land Gate) may refer to the following city gates:
 City Gate, Valletta, Malta
 Porta Spagnola, Augusta, Sicily